Moothedath Higher Secondary School is a high school in Taliparamba, Kerala, India. Founded in 1894, it is one of the oldest schools in the district of Kannur.

History 
The school was founded on November 1, 1894, by Brahmasree Moothedath Mallissery Mallissery Namboodiripad by the vision of providing education to the people of Taliparamba. It started as an English Medium School.The school was accredited as Middle school in 1895 and in the year 1922 the school acquired High School Status. The first batch of  S.S.L.C graduated in the year 1925.

In 1949, Taliparamba Education Society was formed and the school administration was handed over to them from Brahmasree Moothedath Narayanan Namboodiripad. Present President is Sri.MohanaChandran.P and Secretary Adv.Gireesh.G

In 2010, school was allowed to start its Aided Higher secondary Batch. 
In 2020 Celebrated 125th Anniversary.

Extracurricular activities 

 Little KITEs
 Scouts and Guides
 N.C.C.
 Junior Red Cross
 N.S.S
 Friends Club
 Class Magazine
 Vidyarangam Kala Sahitya Vedi

Notable alumni 
 E. K. Nayanar
 K. P. R. Gopalan
 K. P. P. Nambiar
 K. Madhavan

References 

High schools and secondary schools in Kerala
Schools in Kannur district